"Want It, Need It" is a song by American rapper Plies and features R&B singer Ashanti. "Want It" is the second single from his third studio album Da REAList.  So far the single has received positive reviews. The single samples "Two Occasions" by The Deele.  Plies stated that the track was originally to be a track on his second album Definition of Real, but it didn't make the final cut.

Music video
The music video was filmed in Atlanta, Georgia and directed by Yolanda Gerald and Plies. BET's Access Granted filmed the behind the scene footage & aired Saturday February 7, 2009. Want It, Need It premiered on Yahoo! on February 7, 2009. "Want It, Need It" debuted on 106 & Park on Monday, February 9 with a special guest appearance by Plies himself. The video also included model/actress Denyce Lawton.
The video has peaked at number 5 on iTunes Top Hip Hop Music Videos and number 20 on iTunes top music videos.
The video entered BET's 106 & Park countdown on February 23, 2009 at number 10. The song has remained on the countdown for 14 days, peaking at number 2.

Formats and track listings
These are the formats and track listings of major single releases of "Want It, Need It".
US Promo CD
(Released: January 5, 2009)
 "Want It, Need It" (Radio edit) – 4:32
 "Want It, Need It" (Main) – 3:50
 "Want It, Need It" (Instrumental) – 3:50
 "Want It, Need It" (Acapella) – 3:50
 "Want It, Need It" (Remix) Ft Rick Ross - 3:39
Digital download
(Released: February 3, 2009)
 "Want It, Need It" – 3:50

Chart performance

Personnel
 Written by D. Bristol, K. Edmonds, S. Johnson, A. Washington, J. Rotem
 Produced by J. R. Rotem
 Format: Airplay, CD single, music download* Lead & Background Vocals by Plies
 Additional Background Vocals by Jamal Jones & Ashanti
 All Programming by Jamal Jones
 Recorded by: Plies & Ashanti
 Label: Atlantic, Big Gates, Slip-n-Slide

Release history

References

2009 singles
Ashanti (singer) songs
Plies (rapper) songs
Song recordings produced by J. R. Rotem
Songs written by J. R. Rotem
Songs written by Plies (rapper)